Entypus is a genus of spider wasps in the family Pompilidae. There are at least 40 described species in Entypus.

Species
These 38 species belong to the genus Entypus:

 Entypus angusticeps (Townes, 1957)
 Entypus aratus (Townes, 1957)
 Entypus aurifrons (Banks, 1946)
 Entypus bituberculatus (Guerin, 1838)
 Entypus bonariensis (Lepeletier, 1845)
 Entypus brasiliensis (Taschenberg, 1869)
 Entypus caerulans (Lepeletier, 1845)
 Entypus caerulea (Linnaeus, 1758)
 Entypus carinatus (Fox)
 Entypus castanea (Palisot de Beauvois, 1809)
 Entypus cephalotes Saussure, 1868
 Entypus coeruleus (Taschenberg, 1869)
 Entypus concolorans Roig-Alsina, 1981
 Entypus crassiceps Roig-Alsina, 1981
 Entypus decoloratus (Lepeletier, 1845)
 Entypus ecuadorensis (Cameron)
 Entypus ferruginipennis (Haliday, 1837)
 Entypus fossulatus (Giner Marí, 1944)
 Entypus fulvicornis (Cresson, 1867)
 Entypus gigas (Fabricius, 1804)
 Entypus grandis (Banks, 1946)
 Entypus iheringi (Fox, 1899)
 Entypus lepelletierii (Guérin, 1831)
 Entypus luteicornis (Lepeletier, 1845)
 Entypus magnus (Cresson, 1867)
 Entypus mammillatus (Fox, 1897)
 Entypus manni (Banks, 1928)
 Entypus molestus (Banks, 1946)
 Entypus nitidus (Banks, 1946)
 Entypus ochrocerus Dahlbom, 1843
 Entypus perpunctatus (Fox, 1897)
 Entypus persimilis (Banks, 1946)
 Entypus peruvianus (Rohwer, 1913)
 Entypus purpureipes (Cameron)
 Entypus sulphureicornis (Palisot de Beauvois, 1809)
 Entypus unifasciatus (Say, 1828)
 Entypus urichi (Banks, 1945)
 Entypus velutinus (Taschenberg, 1869)

References

External links

 

Pepsinae